Kadrić is a surname. Notable people with the surname include:

 Amer Kadrić (born 1994), Bosnian-Herzegovinian footballer
 Demir Kadrić (born 1994), Serbian footballer
 Esed Kadrić (born 1979), Bosnian politician
 Iris Kadrić (born 1994), Bosnian-Herzegovinian women's footballer
 Rialda Kadrić (1963–2021), actress
 Denis Kadrić (born 1995), famous Bosnian chess grandmaster